Francesco Stephen Castelluccio (born May 3, 1934), better known by his stage name Frankie Valli, is an American singer, known as the frontman of the Four Seasons beginning in 1960. He is known for his unusually powerful lead falsetto voice.

Valli scored 29 top 40 hits with the Four Seasons, one top 40 hit under the Four Seasons alias the Wonder Who?, and nine top 40 hits as a solo artist. As a member of the Four Seasons, Valli's number-one hits include "Sherry" (1962), "Big Girls Don't Cry" (1962), "Walk Like a Man" (1963), "Rag Doll" (1964) and "December, 1963 (Oh, What a Night)" (1975). Valli's recording of the song "Can't Take My Eyes Off You" reached number two in 1967. As a solo artist, Valli scored number-one hits with the songs "My Eyes Adored You" (1974) and "Grease" (1978).

Valli, Tommy DeVito, Nick Massi and Bob Gaudio the original members of the Four Seasons were inducted into the Rock and Roll Hall of Fame in 1990 and the Vocal Group Hall of Fame in 1999.

Early life 
Valli was born Francesco Stephen Castelluccio, on May 3, 1934, to an Italian family in the First Ward of Newark, New Jersey; he was the eldest of three sons. His father, Anthony Castelluccio, was a barber and display designer for Lionel model trains; his mother, Mary Rinaldi, was a homemaker and beer company employee. He was inspired to take up a singing career at the age of seven after his mother took him to see the young Frank Sinatra at the Paramount Theater in Manhattan, New York City. One of his early favorite singers was "Texas" Jean Valli, from whom he adopted his stage name. Until he could support himself with music, he worked as a barber.

Valli's birth year has been called into question. Valli never addressed the issue himself, until the 2007 posting at the Official Frankie Valli Site, sponsored by his current record label, Universal Records. Much of the previous official publicity surrounding his career used 1937 as the birth year. Other sources, such as the Bear Family Records release, titled "The Four Lovers" (BCD 15424), as well as a 1965 mug shot, available through The Smoking Gun, all identify his year of birth as 1934.

Music career

1950s–1960s 
Valli began his singing career in the early 1950s with the Variety Trio (Nickie DeVito, Tommy DeVito, and Nick Macioci). Valli's desire to sing in public was initially granted when – having heard Valli sing – the group offered him a guest spot when they performed. In late 1952, the Variety Trio disbanded and Valli, along with Tommy DeVito, became part of the house band at The Strand in New Brunswick, New Jersey. For his part, Valli played bass and sang.

He cut his first single, "My Mother's Eyes" (a cover of the 1929 George Jessel song from Lucky Boy), in 1953 as "Frankie Valley", a variation on a name he adopted from "Texas" Jean Valli, a female hillbilly singer. As discussed in a 2014 article, "Frankie said in 2010 that Jean took him to meet music publishers Paul and Dave Kapp, telling them he was her brother. As a result, his first single was listed under 'Frankie Valley', and the name stuck—though he eventually changed it to the same spelling ... [as Texas Jean was using]."

Around this time, Valli and Tommy DeVito left the house band at The Strand and formed The Variatones with Hank Majewski, Frank Cottone, and Billy Thompson. In 1956, as part of an audition backing a female singer, the group impressed New York record man Peter Paul, who had them auditioning at RCA Victor a week later.

Renamed the Four Lovers, the group recorded several singles and one album's worth of tracks. They had a minor hit with "You're the Apple of My Eye" in 1956. Nickie DeVito and Hank Majewski left in 1958 to be replaced by Nick Macioci (now Nick Massi) and Hugh Garrity. Massi was in and out of the group, and, occasionally Charles Calello joined on accordion. The group continued to perform until 1959, when Bob Gaudio became a member. After a few more changes, the group was renamed "The Four Seasons" in 1960 after a bowling alley in Union, New Jersey, in which they auditioned at its cocktail lounge.

As the lead singer of the Four Seasons, Valli had a string of hits beginning with the number-one hit "Sherry" in 1962. During this period of his career with The Four Seasons, the group's bassist and vocal arranger Nick Massi was replaced in 1965 by Charlie Calello, the group's instrumental arranger, and, then shortly thereafter, Calello was replaced by Joseph LaBracio, who went by the pseudonym Joe Long.

During the 1960s, Gaudio and his then-songwriting partner, producer Bob Crewe, worked with Valli to craft solo recordings with varying degrees of success. This concept of a major recording artist performing solo in opposition to his or her own group performances was rare in the rock/pop world (Buddy Holly and the Crickets were an exception) and may have given tacit approval to other groups and members of other groups to pursue such a path. The potential to dominate the charts with group and solo recordings was great, and Valli, Gaudio and Crewe occasionally rose to the occasion with both great performances and commercial hits. Valli was the original artist to record the Gaudio-Crewe composition "The Sun Ain't Gonna Shine (Anymore)", a performance that was copied nearly note for note when recorded by the Walker Brothers, an American group based in England. The Walker Brothers version was a huge success. Valli continued to record solo performances and finally reached major success with the release of "Can't Take My Eyes Off You", which reached number two in the charts and was widely recorded by many other artists.

Valli's debut solo album was a gathering together of various single releases and a few new recordings. Before the release of Valli's second solo album, a single was released in July 1967 with the A-side "I Make a Fool of Myself", a record that reached number 18. Timeless, Valli's second solo album release was more coherent and Valli took more time in recording it. Timeless contains one Top 40 hit, "To Give (The Reason I Live)".

Valli ended the 1960s with a string of recordings that were included in the Valli/Four Seasons album Half & Half or released as various singles. The only hit to emerge at this time was the recording of "The Girl I'll Never Know (Angels Never Fly This Low)", reaching number 52.

1970s–1990s 
"You're Ready Now", a Valli solo recording from 1966, became part of the Northern soul scene and reached number eleven on the UK Singles Chart in December 1970. "The Night" originally released in 1970 also became a huge Northern soul hit and as a result it reached number seven on the UK Singles Chart in 1975.

In 1975, his single "My Eyes Adored You" hit number one on the Billboard Hot 100 and reached number 5 in the UK chart. In the same year, he also had a number six Billboard hit with the disco-laden "Swearin' to God" reaching number 31 in the UK chart, while further UK chart success came with "Fallen Angel", written by Guy Fletcher and Doug Flett. Valli was in the UK charts, reaching number 11, with this at the same time as the Four Seasons enjoyed a UK hit with "Silver Star" on which Valli did not appear as lead.

In 1976, Valli covered the Beatles song "A Day in the Life" for the ephemeral musical documentary All This and World War II.

In 1978, he sang the theme song for the film version of the stage play Grease, a song written by Barry Gibb of the Bee Gees, which became a number one hit. He had two further chart successes the following year, "Save Me, Save Me" in November 1978, which entered the Billboard Easy Listening chart; and "Fancy Dancer" in January 1979, which entered the pop charts.

Valli began suffering from otosclerosis in 1967, forcing him to "sing from memory" in the latter part of the 1970s. Surgery performed by Los Angeles ear specialist Victor Goodhill restored most of his hearing by 1980.

Since 2000 

In 2005, the musical Jersey Boys opened on Broadway. Besides performances of many of Frankie Valli and the Four Seasons hit recordings, it features a biographical narrative, told as four separate points of view by each of the members of the Four Seasons (Tommy DeVito, Frankie Valli, Nick Massi and Bob Gaudio), with Valli himself portrayed by John Lloyd Young in the original production. The musical dramatizes several real-life incidents from Valli's life, including his estrangement from daughter Francine, who died in 1980. The show has been widely acclaimed, financially successful, and was nominated for eight Tony Awards, winning four, notably Best Musical, Actor, and Supporting Actor. The musical has touring companies around the world, as well as a version at Paris Las Vegas. This musical was adapted into a 2014 film of the same name directed by Clint Eastwood, with Young again appearing as Valli.

In October 2007, Valli released Romancing the '60s, an album containing covers of his favorite songs from the 1960s, two of which—"Sunny" and "Any Day Now"—he had previously recorded. This was Valli's first solo album in nearly twenty-seven years since 1980's Heaven Above Me.

In October 2012, Valli made his Broadway debut with a week-long concert engagement at the Broadway Theatre in New York starting October 19.

From March 2016 to January 2017, "Frankie Valli and the Four Seasons" were touring the US, scheduled to play small-to-mid-size venues such as the Silver Legacy Casino in Reno, Nevada, the Celebrity Theatre in Phoenix, Arizona and the County Fair in Bloomsburg, Pennsylvania. In October 2016, Valli released his first solo album in nine years, 'Tis the Seasons, which features Valli covering some of his favorite Christmas songs.

As part of the BBC Proms in the Park Valli, together with the Four Seasons performed with the BBC Concert Orchestra in Hyde Park on September 10, 2016.

Frankie Valli and the Four Seasons continued touring in 2018 and 2019, with a new lineup after his lineup since 2003 spun off as its own act, The Modern Gentlemen. However, due to the COVID-19 pandemic, all touring plans were cancelled. Touring resumed in the summer of 2021 with dates scheduled through March 2023. In June 2021, Valli released his twelfth studio album, his first in five years, Touch of Jazz, which features a collection of Jazz cover songs.

Acting career 
Valli has appeared as an actor in Miami Vice (as Mafia boss Frank Doss), Full House, the 1998 TV movie Witness to the Mob (as Frank LoCascio of the Gambino crime family), The Sopranos (as mobster Rusty Millio, once referred to as "The Mayor of Munchkin Land"), and the 2014 film And So It Goes.

On the November 21, 2014, episode of Hawaii Five-0 entitled "Ka Hana malu (Inside Job)", Valli played mysterious lawyer Leonard Cassano who was engaged to Carol Burnett's character, Aunt Deb.

In 2015, Valli did interviews as himself on the AMC television series The Making of the Mob: New York.

Personal life 
Valli has been married three times. He married his first wife, Mary, who already had a two-year-old daughter, when he was in his early twenties. They raised two daughters together and divorced 13 years later in 1971. He married MaryAnn Hannagan in 1974, and that marriage lasted eight years. He then married Randy Clohessy in 1984; they had three sons and separated in 2004. In 1980, his stepdaughter, Celia, was killed when she fell off a fire escape; six months later Francine, his youngest daughter from his marriage to Mary, reportedly died from a drug overdose.

One issue in Valli's third divorce went up on appeal to the Supreme Court of California: whether a life-insurance policy purchased in 2003 was community property. On May 15, 2014, the state supreme court unanimously affirmed the trial court's ruling that the policy was community property (and not Randy's separate property), in an opinion signed by Associate Justice Joyce Kennard.

Discography

Studio albums

Singles

References

External links 

 
 
 
 
 

1934 births
Living people
20th-century American male actors
20th-century American singers
21st-century American male actors
21st-century American singers
20th-century American male singers
21st-century American male singers
American male pop singers
American male television actors
American people of Italian descent
American rock singers
Jersey Shore musicians
Male actors from Newark, New Jersey
Musicians from Newark, New Jersey
New Jersey Hall of Fame inductees
Singers from New Jersey
The Four Seasons (band) members
Warner Records artists
Motown artists
Private Stock Records artists
Universal Motown Records artists